Major-General George Randolph Pearkes,  (February 28, 1888 – May 30, 1984) was a Canadian politician and soldier. He was a recipient of the Victoria Cross, the highest award for gallantry in the face of the enemy awarded to British and Imperial forces; and the 20th lieutenant governor of British Columbia.

Early life
Born in England in Watford, Hertfordshire, on February 28, 1888, he was the oldest child of Louise and George Pearkes and attended Berkhamsted School. In 1906, he and his brother emigrated to Alberta, Canada, where they settled near Red Deer. In 1911, George joined the Royal North-West Mounted Police and served in Yukon until the outbreak of the First World War in August 1914.

A comprehensive biography of Pearkes was written during his lifetime by Reginald Roy, based on 82 one-to-two-hour tape recorded interviews and considerable primary and secondary sources.

Military career

First World War and Victoria Cross
In 1915, Pearkes enlisted in the Canadian Expeditionary Force 2nd Regiment, Canadian Mounted Rifles; transferring in September 1916 to the 5th Battalion Canadian Mounted Rifles. In the photo obtained from Library and Archives Canada (PA-002310) dated December 1917, Major Pearkes, 5th Canadian Mounted Rifles, is shown wearing the Military Cross service ribbon, but has not yet received the ribbon for the Victoria Cross. He is wearing four wound stripes on his sleeve.

Pearkes was 29 years old, and an acting major during the Battle of Passchendaele when the following deed took place for which he was awarded the Victoria Cross (VC):

During the war, he was promoted to lieutenant-colonel. Aside from the VC, Pearkes was also awarded the Distinguished Service Order (DSO) and the Military Cross (MC).

Between the wars
Following the First World War he became a career officer in the army, and went to England in April 1919 to attend the Staff College, Camberley, for the first post-war course there. Among his fellow students there were Ronald Okeden Alexander, Bernard Freyberg, Alan Brooke, John Gort and Percy Hobart, all of whom would rise to high rank, as would John Dill, one of the instructors.

Upon his return to Canada, Pearkes was then appointed to Princess Patricia's Canadian Light Infantry (PPCLI), one of the three infantry regiments of the regular Canadian Army, also known as the Permanent Active Militia (PAM) or the Permanent Force (PF). During the 1920s and early 1930s he was stationed as a staff officer in Winnipeg, Manitoba, and in Calgary, Alberta. He also served as staff officer at the Royal Military College of Canada in Kingston, Ontario. In 1925 Pearkes married Constance Blytha Copeman, and they had two children.

In 1936, he attended the Imperial Defence College in London. Among his fellow students there were Frank McNamara and Sydney Rowell, both from Australia; other students included William Slim and Keith Park.

From 1938 to 1940 he was District Officer Commanding 13th Military District in Calgary. With the opening of hostilities with Germany in the Second World War, Brigadier Pearkes was given command of the 2nd Canadian Infantry Brigade, a component of the 1st Canadian Infantry Division, which comprised a number of units raised in western Canada.

Second World War
In December 1939, Pearkes, by then age 51, and his staff left for England where the 1st Division, commanded by Major General Andrew McNaughton, was finally concentrated in a single place as a formation. In February 1940 he developed a serious case of spinal meningitis and it was feared that he might die, with the situation becoming so serious that his wife and son were sent to England from Canada. Miraculously, however, he managed to recover and, in fact, met his wife and son upon their arrival.

In July 1940, after the surrender of France, Pearkes succeeded McNaughton in command of the 1st Canadian Infantry Division. In November 1941 Pearkes was asked to assume temporary command of the expanding Canadian Corps, taking the place of McNaughton who was on an extended leave. Lieutenant-General Bernard Montgomery of the British Army, whose opinions of Canadian officers were crucial in the careers of senior officers overseas in the mid-war period, said Pearkes was a, "gallant soldier" albeit one who, in his opinion, possessed, "little brains."

In August 1942 Pearkes was returned to Canada and became General Officer Commanding in Chief Pacific Command, primarily a home defence organization for western Canada. He oversaw defences on Canada's West Coast.

In 1943 Pearkes was part of the planning for Operation Greenlight, retaking the Aleutian Islands from the Japanese.

During the Second World War, in 1944, Pearkes was instrumental in suppressing the Terrace Mutiny, a revolt by conscripts stationed in Terrace, British Columbia resulting from the announcement that conscripts would be deployed overseas. Although successful, Pearkes was extremely critical of the actions that led to it in the first place, stating he had been placed in the "intolerable position of being ordered to enforce a policy which his past experience gained in applying similar policies has proven ruinous to discipline of [troops], and of being in an utterly dishonourable position, and [Pearkes said] that he will NOT issue instructions to his [junior commanders] placing them in an impossible situation."

When it became clear that the government was not considering deploying troops for the fighting in the Pacific, Pearkes requested a change of command, or to be allowed to retire. The Cabinet War Committee eventually decided on the latter, and he retired from the Army in February 1945. He went into federal politics, winning the Nanaimo, British Columbia riding for the Progressive Conservative Party.

Political career

In the 1945 federal election, he was elected as a Progressive Conservative Party candidate in the riding of Nanaimo, British Columbia. He was re-elected in 1949. In the 1953 election, he was elected in the riding of Esquimalt—Saanich, British Columbia. He was re-elected in the 1957 and 1958 elections.

He was Minister of National Defence from 1957 to 1960 under Prime Minister John Diefenbaker. In 1958, Pearkes recommended that the Avro Arrow programme be cancelled. In a historic turning point for Canadian aviation, the costly programme was cancelled in 1959 in favour of a less costly reliance on missile defense with NORAD. He resigned from federal politics in 1960.

Lieutenant governor and later life
He became Lieutenant Governor of British Columbia on October 13, 1960, and became one of the few Lieutenant Governors to agree to an extended term, serving until July 1968.

In 1967, he was made a Companion of the Order of Canada. Pearkes died on May 30, 1984, in Victoria, British Columbia, and is commemorated at the Holy Trinity Cemetery, West Saanich, Sidney, Victoria, British Columbia, Canada. Section 4 – West. His Victoria Cross is displayed at the Canadian War Museum in Ottawa.

Family
In August 1925, he married Constance Blytha Copeman. A daughter, Priscilla Edith ("Pep"), was born in 1928 though she died while still a young child. A son, John Andre, was born in 1931.

Legacy
Pearkes' name has been honoured in various ways, including:
George R. Pearkes Arena in Saanich, British Columbia.
Mount Pearkes, along the mainland British Columbia south coast.
The George R. Pearkes Children's Foundation
The George R. Pearkes Centre for Children, a treatment facility for children with cerebral palsy, now part of the Queen Alexandra Centre for Children's Health in Victoria, British Columbia.
General George R. Pearkes Elementary School in Hudson's Hope, British Columbia.
The George R. Pearkes Building which houses the Canadian Department of National Defence Headquarters, in Ottawa.
The George R. Pearkes, VC Branch of the Royal Canadian Legion in Summerside, Prince Edward Island.
CCGS George R. Pearkes, a Canadian Coast Guard icebreaker.
There are numerous thoroughfares named for him.

He donated a ceremonial sword to Berkhamsted School in Berkhamsted, Hertfordshire to be awarded each year to the school's best senior NCO cadet.

Honours and awards
Major-General George Pearkes received numerous awards during his life, including the following.

He was sworn in as a Member of the Queen's Privy Council for Canada on June 21, 1957. This gave Him the right to use the honorific prefix "The Honourable" and the post nominal letters "PC" for life.

He received the Key to the City of:

North Vancouver in British Columbia on March 21, 1966. 
Burnaby in British Columbia on June 14, 1968.
Vancouver in British Columbia on August 27, 1968.

He received the Freedom of the City of:

Nelson in British Columbia, 1961.
Port Alberni in British Columbia on October 26, 1967.
Kelowna in British Columbia, 1967.
Central Saanich in British Columbia, 1970.
Vernon in British Columbia, 1970.
Penticton in British Columbia, 1973.

He also received the Order of the Dogwood in 1968.

Scholastic

Honorary degrees
 He received honorary degrees from many universities including

Honorary degrees

References

Bibliography

External links

Order of Canada Citation
Biography from the website of the Lieutenant Governor of British Columbia

Legion Magazine Article about George Pearkes and the Victoria Cross
George Randolph Pearkes fonds at University of Victoria, Special Collections
Canadian Great War Project – profile of George Pearkes
www.british empire.co.uk - photo and role in RNWMP
George Randoph Pearkes digitized service file
Generals of World War II

|-

1888 births
1984 deaths
Canadian generals
Canadian World War I recipients of the Victoria Cross
Lieutenant Governors of British Columbia
Progressive Conservative Party of Canada MPs
Members of the House of Commons of Canada from British Columbia
Members of the King's Privy Council for Canada
Canadian Companions of the Order of the Bath
Canadian Companions of the Distinguished Service Order
Companions of the Order of Canada
Canadian recipients of the Military Cross
Recipients of the Croix de Guerre 1914–1918 (France)
Foreign recipients of the Legion of Merit
People from Watford
People educated at Berkhamsted School
British emigrants to Canada
Royal Canadian Mounted Police officers
Academic staff of the Royal Military College of Canada
Canadian Expeditionary Force officers
Canadian military personnel of World War I
Graduates of the Royal College of Defence Studies
Canadian Army generals of World War II
Graduates of the Staff College, Camberley
Princess Patricia's Canadian Light Infantry officers
Military personnel from Hertfordshire